Wailua Homesteads is a census-designated place (CDP) in Kauai County, Hawaii, United States. The population was 5,863 at the 2020 census, up from 4,567 at the 2000 census.

Geography
Wailua Homesteads is located on the eastern side of the island of Kauai at  (22.064507, -159.383875). It is bordered to the north by Kapaa, to the east by Wailua, and to the south by the Wailua River and its north fork.

Demographics

As of the census of 2000, there were 4,567 people, 1,655 households, and 1,189 families residing in the CDP. The racial makeup of the CDP was 39.9% White, 0.4% African American, 0.4% Native American, 24.3% Asian, 7.9% Pacific Islander, 1.0% from other races, and 26.1% from two or more races. Hispanic or Latino of any race were 8.8% of the population.

There were 1,655 households, out of which 35.5% had children under the age of 18 living with them, 56.6% were married couples living together, 10.3% had a female householder with no husband present, and 28.1% were non-families. 19.6% of all households were made up of individuals, and 4.1% had someone living alone who was 65 years of age or older.  The average household size was 2.72 and the average family size was 3.14.

In the CDP the population was spread out, with 26.3% under the age of 18, 6.2% from 18 to 24, 26.7% from 25 to 44, 32.0% from 45 to 64, and 8.8% who were 65 years of age or older.  The median age was 40 years. For every 100 females there were 101.7 males.  For every 100 females age 18 and over, there were 99.6 males.

The median income for a household in the CDP was $48,047, and the median income for a family was $53,558. Males had a median income of $35,469 versus $26,827 for females. The per capita income for the CDP was $23,675.  About 7.7% of families and 8.9% of the population were below the poverty line, including 13.3% of those under age 18 and 3.7% of those age 65 or over.

References

Census-designated places in Kauai County, Hawaii
Populated places on Kauai